Stig Gustafsson (born 5 May 1930) is a Swedish former footballer who played as a defender. He made 112 Allsvenskan appearances for Djurgårdens IF.

Honours
Djurgårdens IF
 Allsvenskan: 1959

References

1930 births
Living people
Association football defenders
Swedish footballers
Allsvenskan players
Djurgårdens IF Fotboll players